Liezel Huber and Ai Sugiyama were the defending champions, but they were defeated in the quarterfinals by Nathalie Dechy and Patty Schnyder.

Janette Husárová and Elena Likhovtseva won the title, defeating Dechy and Schnyder in the final 6–2, 7–5.

Seeds

Draw

Draw

Qualifying

Seeds

Qualifiers

  Jelena Janković /  Caroline Schneider

Draw

References
 Main and Qualifying Draws (WTA Archive)

Generali Ladies Linz - Doubles